Wartburg Presbyterian Church is a historic Presbyterian church in Wartburg, Tennessee. The congregation was established in 1879 and the church building was constructed in 1883. The church building was listed on the National Register of Historic Places in December 2013.

Church services are held every Sunday morning at 11:00 a.m. Everyone is invited to attend. Casual dress is acceptable. The pastor of the church is Carolyn S. Anderson.

References

Churches on the National Register of Historic Places in Tennessee
Buildings and structures in Morgan County, Tennessee
Presbyterian churches in Tennessee
National Register of Historic Places in Morgan County, Tennessee